Kuala Belait Highway, (Jawi: ليبوهراي کوالا بلايت ) is a major highway in Belait District, Brunei. It bypasses the town centers of Seria and Kuala Belait, in addition to the Sungai Belait toll bridge, which is not present along the original route of the Pan Borneo Highway. Along the section of the original route of the Pan Borneo Highway between Kampung Sungai Teraban and Kampung Lumut, motorists may need to cross the Belait River via a river ferry service; therefore, the Belait River bridge at the Kuala Belait Highway enables motorists to cross the river directly without using the river ferry service which may become dangerous during bad weather. The section of the Kuala Belait highway that passes through Seria is generally known as the 'Seria Bypass'. Construction is under way to expand the part of the Kuala Belait Highway from a single carriageway highway to a dual carriageway highway.

Roads and Highways in Brunei